The 1894–95 season is the 21st season of competitive football by Rangers.

Overview
Rangers played a total of 19 competitive matches during the 1894–95 season. They finished third in the Scottish League Division One, behind Celtic and winners Heart of Midlothian, with a record of 10 wins from 18 matches.

The club ended the season without the Scottish Cup. They were knocked out of the first round by Heart of Midlothian, losing 2–1 at home.

Results
All results are written with Rangers' score first.

Scottish League Division One

Scottish Cup

Appearances

See also
 1894–95 in Scottish football
 1894–95 Scottish Cup

Rangers F.C. seasons
Rangers